The 2013 British Columbia general election took place on May 14, 2013, to elect the 85 members of the 40th Parliament of British Columbia to the Legislative Assembly in the Canadian province of British Columbia. The British Columbia Liberal Party (BC Liberals) formed the government during the 39th Parliament prior to this general election, initially under the leadership of Premier Gordon Campbell then after his resignation, Christy Clark. The British Columbia New Democratic Party (BC NDP) under the leadership of Carole James, and then Adrian Dix, formed the Official Opposition. The BC Green Party under the leadership of Jane Sterk and the BC Conservative Party under John Cummins were also included in polling, although neither party had representation at the end of the 39th Parliament.

The Liberal Party won its fourth straight majority; Clark was defeated in her riding, but she was re-elected to the legislature in a subsequent by-election in Westside-Kelowna on July 10, 2013, after Liberal MLA Ben Stewart stepped down on her behalf. The NDP remained the official opposition, losing two seats, and the Green Party won its first seat.

Despite their victory, the Liberals had been consistently several points behind the opposition New Democrats in every public opinion poll throughout the campaign. Even poll results released on the last day of the campaign suggested that the New Democrats had an eight to nine percentage point margin over the Liberals. Only one pollster, Forum Research, had released a poll which suggested that the Liberals were close enough that a victory was even possible for them, although even that poll had the New Democrats ahead by two percentage points. The Liberals' upset victory led to significant media debate about the quality of opinion polling in Canadian elections.

Timing
Section 23 of British Columbia's Constitution Act provides that general elections occur on the second Tuesday in May of the fourth calendar year after the last election. As an election was held on May 12, 2009, the next election was scheduled for May 14, 2013. The same section, though, makes the fixed election date subject to the Lieutenant Governor's right to dissolve the Legislative Assembly as he or she sees fit.

The writs were dropped April 16, 2013, and the general election was held on May 14, 2013, with advance voting made available on May 8 through 11.

Background
After leading the BC Liberals for 17 years, Gordon Campbell announced he would resign as Premier and party leader in November 2010. This was seen as the result of opposition to the Harmonized Sales Tax, which was very unpopular with voters.

In the ensuing leadership campaign, Christy Clark, the eventual winner, suggested she would prefer to hold an election earlier than 2013 to secure her own mandate. She was believed to be preparing her party for an election as early as autumn 2011. However, due to the unfavourable result from the HST referendum, she decided to rule out an early election.

Political parties
This is a list of political parties who ran candidates in the 2013 election:

Results

!rowspan="2" colspan="2" style="text-align: center;"|Party
!rowspan="2" style="text-align: center;"|Party leader
!rowspan="2" style="text-align: center;"|Candidates
!colspan="5" style="text-align: center;"|Seats
!colspan="3" style="text-align: center;"|Popular vote
|-
|style="text-align: center;"|2009
|style="text-align: center;"|Dissolution
|style="text-align: center;"|Elected
|style="text-align: center;"|% change
|style="text-align: center;"|Seats %
|style="text-align: center;"|#
|style="text-align: center;"|%
|style="text-align: center;"|Change (pp)

|style="text-align: left;"| Christy Clark
|85 ||49 ||45 ||49 ||+8.89 ||57.6||794,946 ||44.14 ||−1.68

|style="text-align: left;"| Adrian Dix
|85 ||35 ||36 ||34 ||−5.56 ||40.0||715,999 ||39.71 ||−2.44

|style="text-align: left;"| Jane Sterk
|61 ||— ||— ||1 ||* ||1.2||146,607 ||8.13 ||−0.08

|colspan="2" style="text-align: left;"|Independent
|35 ||1 ||4 ||1 ||−75.0 ||1.2||42,565 ||2.36 ||+1.31

|style="text-align: left;"| John Cummins
|56 ||— ||— ||— ||— ||—||85,783 ||4.76 ||+2.66

|colspan="2" style="text-align: left;"|No Affiliation
|11 ||— ||— ||— ||— ||—||6,751 ||0.37 ||+0.28

|style="text-align: left;"| vacant
|8 ||— ||— ||— ||— ||—||2,049 ||0.11 ||+0.02

|style="text-align: left;"| Salvatore Vetro
|2 ||* ||— ||— ||— ||—||1,271 ||0.07 ||*

|style="text-align: left;"| Michael Halliday
|6 ||* ||— ||— ||— ||—||995 ||0.06 ||*

|style="text-align: left;"| Jagmohan Bhandari
|4 ||* ||— ||— ||— ||—||878 ||0.05 ||*

|style="text-align: left;"| Wilfred Hanni
|2 ||* ||— ||— ||— ||—||828 ||0.05 ||*

|style="text-align: left;"| Marc Emery
|2 ||— ||— ||— ||— ||—||766 ||0.04 ||+0.02

|style="text-align: left;"| James Filippelli
|2 ||— ||— ||— ||— ||—||528 ||0.03 ||+0.01

|style="text-align: left;"| vacant
|3 ||* ||— ||— ||— ||—||445 ||0.02 ||*

|style="text-align: left;"| Samuel Hammond
|4 ||— ||— ||— ||— ||—||388 ||0.02 ||−0.01

|style="text-align: left;"| vacant
|1 ||* ||— ||— ||— ||—||384 ||0.02 ||*

|style="text-align: left;"| Alan Saldanha
|1 ||* ||— ||— ||— ||—||282 ||0.02 ||*

|style="text-align: left;"| Michael Donovan
|2 ||* ||— ||— ||— ||—||248 ||0.01 ||*

|style="text-align: left;"| Conrad Schmidt
|2 ||— ||— ||— ||— ||—||145 ||0.01 ||−0.01

|style="text-align: left;"| Michael Yawney
|2 ||* ||— ||— ||— ||—||137 ||0.01 ||*

|style="text-align: left;"| Espavo Sozo
|2 ||* ||— ||— ||— ||— ||56 ||0.00 ||*
|-
!colspan="3" style="text-align: center;" | Total
!376 !!85 !!85 !!85 !!— !!100.0 !!1,803,051 !!100.00
|}

Voter turnout
Voter turnout was 57.1%, but varied from riding to riding. 10 of the 85 ridings had less than 50% voter turnout. Richmond and Kelowna were the only major cities with under 50% turnout.

Retiring incumbents

Liberals
 George Abbott, Shuswap
 Bill Barisoff, Penticton
 Pat Bell, Prince George-Mackenzie
 Harry Bloy, Burnaby-Lougheed
 Ron Cantelon, Parksville-Qualicum
 Murray Coell, Saanich North and the Islands
 Kevin Falcon, Surrey-Cloverdale
Colin Hansen, Vancouver-Quilchena
 Randy Hawes, Abbotsford-Mission
 Dave Hayer, Surrey-Tynehead
 Kash Heed, Vancouver-Fraserview
 Rob Howard, Richmond Centre
 Kevin Krueger, Kamloops-South Thompson
 Blair Lekstrom, Peace River South
 John Les, Chilliwack
 Joan McIntyre, West Vancouver-Sea to Sky
 Mary McNeil, Vancouver-False Creek

New Democrats
 Dawn Black, New Westminster
 Gary Coons, North Coast
 Guy Gentner, Delta North
 Michael Sather, Maple Ridge-Pitt Meadows
 Diane Thorne, Coquitlam-Maillardville

Independents
 John Slater, Boundary-Similkameen

Opinion polls

Results by riding

The following is a list of results by riding.
Names in bold indicate party leaders and cabinet ministers.
The victorious Member of the Legislative Assembly (MLA) for each district has a coloured bar to the left of his or her name.
Incumbents who did not seek re-election are denoted by †
Conservative candidates who are listed as "non-affiliated" are denoted by ‡

Northern British Columbia

|-
| style="background:whitesmoke;"|Nechako Lakes
||
|John Rustad  5,324 – 53.79%
|
|Sussanne Skidmore-Hewlett  2,737 – 27.65%
|
|Colin Hamm  510 – 5.15%
|
|Dan Brooks  1,253 – 12.66%
|
|Beverly Bird (Advocational)  74 – 0.75%
||
|John Rustad
|-
| style="background:whitesmoke;"|North Coast
|
|Judy Fraser  2,692 – 33.07%
||
|Jennifer Rice  4,617 – 56.72%
|
|Hondo Arendt  821 – 10.21%
|
|
|
|
||
|Gary Coons†
|-
| style="background:whitesmoke;"|Peace River North
||
|Pat Pimm  7,905 – 58.94%
|
|Judy Fox-McGuire  1,319 – 9.84%
|
|
|
|Wyeth Sigurdson  900 – 6.71%
|
|Arthur Hadland (Ind.)  3,287 – 24.51%
||
|Pat Pimm
|-
| style="background:whitesmoke;"|Peace River South
||
|Mike Bernier  4,373 – 46.73%
|
|Darwin Wren  1,988 – 21.24%
|
|
|
|Kurt Peats  2,546 – 27.21%
| 
|Tyrel Pohl (Ind.)  451 – 4.84%
||
|Blair Lekstrom†
|-
| style="background:whitesmoke;"|Prince George-Mackenzie
||
|Mike Morris  10,689 – 55.19%
|
|Bobby Deepak  6,725 – 34.73%
|
|Karen McDowell  1,094 – 5.65%
|
|Terry Rysz  858 – 4.43%
|
|
||
|Pat Bell†
|-
| style="background:whitesmoke;"|Prince George-Valemount
||
|Shirley Bond  11,291 – 56.95%
|
|Sherry Ogasawara  7,116 – 35.89%
|
|
|
|Nathan Giede  1,105 – 5.57%
|
|Donald Roberts (Christian)  314 – 1.58%
||
|Shirley Bond
|-
| style="background:whitesmoke;"|Skeena
|
|Carol Leclerc  5,087 – 43.27%
||
|Robin Austin  5,609 – 47.71%
|
|
|
|Mike Brousseau  797 – 6.78%
|
|Trevor Hendry (BC Party)  263 – 2.24%
||
|Robin Austin
|-
| style="background:whitesmoke;"|Stikine
|
|Sharon Hartwell  3,167 – 36.61%
||
|Doug Donaldson  4,074 – 47.10%
|
|Roger Benham  303 – 3.50%
|
|Jonathan Dieleman  533 – 6.16%
|
|Rod Taylor (Christian)  514- 5.94% Jesse O'Leary (Ind.)  59 – 0.68%
||
|Doug Donaldson
|-

Kootenays

|-
| style="background:whitesmoke;"|Columbia River-Revelstoke
|
|Doug Clovechok  4,847 – 36.19%
||
|Norm Macdonald  6,463 – 48.26%
|
|Laurel Ralston  921 – 6.88%
|
|Earl Olsen  1,162 – 8.68%
|
|
||
|Norm Macdonald
|-
| style="background:whitesmoke;"|Kootenay East
||
|Bill Bennett  10,173 – 63.01%
|
|Norma Blissett  5,973 – 36.99%
|
|
|
|
|
|
||
|Bill Bennett
|-
| style="background:whitesmoke;"|Kootenay West
|
|Jim Postnikoff  3,831 – 21.28%
||
|Katrine Conroy  11,349 – 63.04%
|
|
|
|
|
|Joseph Hughes (Ind.)  2,391 – 13.28% Glen Byle (Ind.)  431 – 2.39%
||
|Katrine Conroy
|-
| style="background:whitesmoke;"|Nelson-Creston
|
|Greg Garbula  4,577 – 28.32%
||
|Michelle Mungall  8,200 – 50.73%
|
|Sjeng Derkx  3,387 – 20.95%
|
|
|
|
||
|Michelle Mungall
|-

Okanagan, Shuswap and Boundary

|-
| style="background:whitesmoke;"|Boundary-Similkameen
||
|Linda Larson  8,499 – 46.59%
|
|Sam Hancheroff  7,113 – 38.99%
|
|John Kwasnica  1,602 – 8.78%
|
|
|
|Mischa Popoff (N.A.)  655 – 3.59% Doug Pederson (Ind.) 375 – 2.06%
||
|John Slater†
|-
| style="background:whitesmoke;"|Kelowna-Lake Country
||
|Norm Letnick  12,149 – 56.78%
|
|Mike Nuyens  5,306 – 24.80%
|
|Gary Adams  1,591 – 7.44%
|
|Graeme James  2,351 – 10.99%
|
|
||
|Norm Letnick
|-
| style="background:whitesmoke;"|Kelowna-Mission
||
|Steve Thomson  13,687 – 56.86%
|
|Tish Lakes  6,221 – 25.84%
|
|
|
|Mike McLoughlin  3,051 – 12.67%
|
|Dayleen Van Ryswyk (Ind.)  1,113 – 4.62%
||
|Steve Thomson
|-
| style="background:whitesmoke;"|Penticton
||
|Dan Ashton  11,551 – 45.90%
|
|Richard Cannings  10,154 – 40.35%
|
|
|
|Sean Upshaw  2,277 – 9.05%
|
|Doug Maxwell (BC First)  1,181 – 4.69%
||
|Bill Barisoff†
|-
| style="background:whitesmoke;"|Shuswap
||
|Greg Kyllo  11,992 – 47.92%
|
|Steve Gunner  7,398 – 29.56%
|
|Chris George  2,338 – 9.34%
|
|Tom Birch  3,232 – 12.92%
|
|Johanna Zalcik (Advocational)  63 – 0.25%
||
|George Abbott†
|-
| style="background:whitesmoke;"|Vernon-Monashee
||
|Eric Foster  12,503 – 46.34%
|
|Marc Olsen  9,233 – 34.22%
|
|Rebecca Helps  1,905 – 7.06%
|
|Scott Anderson  3,169 – 11.75%
|
|Korry Zepik (Ind.)  169 – 0.63%
||
|Eric Foster
|-
| style="background:whitesmoke;"|Westside-Kelowna
||
|Ben Stewart  12,987 – 58.39%
|
|Carole Gordon  6,790 – 30.53%
|
|
|
|Brian Guillou  2,466 – 11.09%
|
|
||
|Ben Stewart
|-

Thompson and Cariboo

|-
| style="background:whitesmoke;"|Cariboo-Chilcotin
||
|Donna Barnett  7,679 – 56.18%
|
|Charlie Wyse  4,740 – 34.68%
|
|Dustin Price  747 – 5.46%
|
|
|
|Gary Young (Ind.)  503 – 3.68%
||
|Donna Barnett
|-
| style="background:whitesmoke;"|Cariboo North
||
|Coralee Oakes  5,867 – 41.41%
|
|Duncan Barnett  3,036 – 21.43%
|
|
|
|
|
|Bob Simpson (Ind.)  5,264 – 37.16%
||
|Bob Simpson
|-
| style="background:whitesmoke;"|Fraser-Nicola
||
|Jackie Tegart  6,002 – 44.14%
|
|Harry Lali  5,388 – 39.62%
|
|John Kidder  1,314 – 9.66%
|
|Michael Beauclair  895 – 6.58%
|
|
||
|Harry Lali
|-
| style="background:whitesmoke;"|Kamloops-North Thompson
||
|Terry Lake  12,183 – 52.06%
|
|Kathy Kendall  9,139 – 39.05%
|
|
|
|Ed Klop  1,644 – 7.03%
|
|John Ford (Ind.)  436 – 1.86%
||
|Terry Lake
|-
| style="background:whitesmoke;"|Kamloops-South Thompson
||
|Todd Stone  15,092 – 57.09%
|
|Tom Friedman  9,291 – 35.15%
|
|
|
|Peter Sharp  1,623 – 6.14%
|
|Brian Alexander (Ind.)  428 – 1.62%
||
|Kevin Krueger†
|-

Fraser Valley

|-
| style="background:whitesmoke;"|Abbotsford-Mission
||
|Simon Gibson  10,416 – 50.73%
|
|Preet Rai  5,574 – 27.15%
|
|Aird Flavelle  1,864 – 9.07%
|
|Don Stahl  1,945 – 9.47%
|
|Wendy Bales (Ind.) 413 – 2.01%Roman Bojczuk (Ind.) 204 – 0.99%Marcus Halliday (Excal.) 119 – 0.58%
||
|Randy Hawes†
|-
| style="background:whitesmoke;"|Abbotsford South
||
|Darryl Plecas  9,564 – 47.74%
|
|Lakhvinder Jhaj  4,210 – 21.01%
|
|
|
|
|
|John van Dongen (Ind.) 5,587 – 27.89%Steve Finlay (Marijuana) 417 – 2.18%Patricia Smith (Excal.) 256 – 1.28%
||
|John van Dongen
|-
| style="background:whitesmoke;"|Abbotsford West
||
|Mike de Jong 9,473 – 50.38%
|
|Sukhi Dhami  5,530 – 29.41%
|
|Stephen O'Shea  877 – 4.66%
|
|Paul Redekopp  1,791 – 9.53%
|
|Moe Gill (Ind.) 1,082 – 5.75%Kerry-Lynn Osbourne (Excalibur)49 – 0.26%
||
|Mike de Jong
|-
| style="background:whitesmoke;"|Chilliwack
||
|John Martin  9,983 – 47.58%
|
|Patti MacAhonic  6,548 – 31.21%
|
|Kim Reimer  1,761 – 8.39%
|
|Chad Eros  2,510 – 11.96%
|
|Michael Halliday (Excalibur)  181 – 0.86%
||
|John Les†
|-
| style="background:whitesmoke;"|Chilliwack-Hope
||
|Laurie Throness  10,053 – 49.15%
|
|Gwen O'Mahony  7,364 – 36.01%
|
|
|
|Michael Henshall  2,202 – 10.77%
|
|Ryan Ashley McKinnon (Ind.) 833 – 4.07%
||
|Gwen O'Mahony
|-
| style="background:whitesmoke;"|Fort Langley-Aldergrove
||
|Rich Coleman  15,989 – 55.10%
|
|Shane Dyson  7,511 – 25.89%
|
|Lisa David  2,229 – 7.68%
|
|Rick Manuel  2,615 – 9.01%
|
|Kevin Mitchell (Ind.)  672 – 2.32%
||
|Rich Coleman
|-
| style="background:whitesmoke;"|Langley
||
|Mary Polak  14,039 – 51.44%
|
|Andrew Mercier  7,403 – 27.13%
|
|Wally Martin  2,608 – 9.56%
|
|John Cummins  3,242 – 11.88%
|
|
||
|Mary Polak
|-
| style="background:whitesmoke;"|Maple Ridge-Mission
||
|Marc Dalton  10,327 – 46.59%
|
|Mike Bocking  8.830 – 39.84%
|
|Alex Pope  1,818 – 8.20%
|
|Chad Thompson  1,190 – 5.37%
|
|
||
|Marc Dalton
|-
| style="background:whitesmoke;"|Maple Ridge-Pitt Meadows
||
|Doug Bing  10,824 – 45.49%
|
|Elizabeth Rosenau  10,204 – 42.88%
|
|Michael Patterson  2,178 – 9.15%
|
|Manuel Pratas‡  589 – 2.48%
|
|
||
|Michael Sather†
|-

Surrey

|-
| style="background:whitesmoke;"|Surrey-Cloverdale
||
|Stephanie Cadieux  18,001 – 59.46%
|
|Harry Kooner  8,777 – 28.99%
|
|
|
|Howard Wu  2,541 – 8.39%
|
|Matt William Begley (N.A)  953 – 3.15%
||
|Kevin Falcon†
|-
| style="background:whitesmoke;"|Surrey-Fleetwood
||
|Peter Fassbender  8,974 – 45.43%
|
|Jagrup Brar  8,774 – 44.41%
|
|Tim Binnema  1,147 – 5.81%
|
|Murali Krishnan  801 – 4.05%
|
|Arvin Kumar (Vision)  59 – 0.30%
||
|Jagrup Brar
|-
| style="background:whitesmoke;"|Surrey-Green Timbers
|
|Amrik Tung  5,581 – 34.52%
||
|Sue Hammell  9,386 – 58.06%
|
|Richard Hosein  655 – 4.05%
|
|Lisa Maharaj  444 – 2.75%
|
|Harjit Heir (Vision)  101 – 0.62%
||
|Sue Hammell
|-
| style="background:whitesmoke;"|Surrey-Newton
|
|Sukhminder Virk  6,604 – 38.07%
||
|Harry Bains  9,788 – 56.42%
|
|
|
|Satinder Singh  674 – 3.89%
|
|Alan Saldanha (HHP)  282 – 1.63%
||
|Harry Bains
|-
| style="background:whitesmoke;"|Surrey-Panorama
||
|Marvin Hunt  14,139 – 54.29%
|
|Amrik Mahil  9,307 – 35.74%
|
|Sara Sharma  1,478 – 5.68%
|
|Kevin Rakhra  1,037 – 3.98%
|
|Ali Zaidi (N.A)  81 – 0.31%
||
|Stephanie Cadieux
|-
| style="background:whitesmoke;"|Surrey-Tynehead
||
|Amrik Virk  9,172 – 48.15%
|
|Avtar Bains  7,539 – 39.58%
|
|
|
|Barry Sikora  2,040 – 10.71%
|
|Sukhi Gill (Vision)  298 – 1.56%
||
|Dave Hayer†
|-
| style="background:whitesmoke;"|Surrey-Whalley
|
|Kuljeet Kaur  5,004 – 29.54
||
|Bruce Ralston  10,405 – 61.43%
|
|
|
|Sunny Chohan  1,110 – 6.55%
|
|Jag Bhandari (Vision)  420 – 2.48%
||
|Bruce Ralston
|-
| style="background:whitesmoke;"|Surrey-White Rock
||
|Gordon Hogg  15,092 – 58.09%
|
|Susan Keeping  7,180 – 27.63%
|
|Don Pitcairn  2,304 – 8.87%
|
|Elizabeth Pagtakhan  1,301 – 5.01%
|
|Jim Laurence (BC Party)  105 – 0.40%
||
|Gordon Hogg
|-

Richmond and Delta

|-
| style="background:whitesmoke;"|Delta North
||
|Scott Hamilton 9,613 – 44.53%
|
|Sylvia Bishop  9,410 – 43.59%
|
|Bill Marshall  1,312 – 6.08%
|
|Tinku Parmar  983 – 4.55%
|
|John Shavluk (Ind.) 210 – 0.97% George Gidora (Comm.) 58 – 0.27% 
||
|Guy Gentner†
|-
| style="background:whitesmoke;"|Delta South
|
|Bruce McDonald  8,721 – 36.65%
|
|Nic Slater  3,700 – 15.55%
|
|
|
|
||
|Vicki Huntington (Ind.)  11,376 – 47.80%
||
|Vicki Huntington
|-
| style="background:whitesmoke;"|Richmond Centre
||
|Teresa Wat 9,459 – 49.91%
|
|Frank Yunrong Huang 4,416 – 23.30%
|
|Michael Wolfe  1,678 – 8.85%
|
|Lawrence Chen  961 – 5.07%
|
|Gary Law (Ind.) 1,604 – 8.46%Richard Lee (Ind.) 754 – 3.98%Chanel Donovan (Unparty) 82 – 0.43%
||
|Rob Howard†
|-
| style="background:whitesmoke;"|Richmond East
||
|Linda Reid 11,592 – 54.66%
|
|Gian Sihota 6,047 – 28.51%
|
|Doug Perry  1,178 – 5.55%
|
|Nathaniel Lim  1,827 – 8.61%
|
|Lloyd Chen (Ind.) 256 – 1.21%Ping Chan (Excalibur) 175 – 0.83%Cliff Wei (Ind.) 133 – 0.63%
||
|Linda Reid
|-
| style="background:whitesmoke;"|Richmond-Steveston
||
|John Yap 12,063 – 51.67%
|
|Scott Stewart  6,553 – 28.07%
|
|Jerome Dickey  1,904 – 8.15%
|
|Carol Day  2,662 – 11.40%
|
|Mike Donovan (Unparty)  166 – 0.71%
||
|John Yap
|-

Vancouver's eastern suburbs

|-
| style="background:whitesmoke;"|Burnaby-Deer Lake
|
|Shian Gu  7,286 – 43.13%
||
|Kathy Corrigan  8,189 – 48.48%
|
|Rick McGowan  1,417 – 8.39%
|
|
|
|
||
|Kathy Corrigan
|-
| style="background:whitesmoke;"|Burnaby-Edmonds
|
|Jeff Kuah  6,950 – 39.63%
||
|Raj Chouhan  9,253 – 51.43%
|
|Wyatt Tessari  1,573 – 8.74%
|
|
|
|Nicholas Edward D'Amico (Excal.)  215 – 1.20%
||
|Raj Chouhan
|-
| style="background:whitesmoke;"|Burnaby-Lougheed
|
|Ken Kramer  8,209 – 40.59%
||
|Jane Shin  8,952 – 44.26%
|
|Darwin Burns  1,665 – 8.23%
|
|Christine Clarke‡  1,399 – 6.92%
|
|
||
|Harry Bloy†
|-
| style="background:whitesmoke;"|Burnaby North
||
|Richard T. Lee  10,543 – 46.82%
|
|Janet Routledge  9,875 – 43.85%
|
|Carrie McLaren  1,577 – 7.00%
|
|Wayne Marklund‡  523 – 2.32%
|
|
||
|Richard T. Lee
|-
| style="background:whitesmoke;"|Coquitlam-Burke Mountain
||
|Douglas Horne  9,766 – 49.87%
|
|Chris Wilson  7,315 – 37.35%
|
|Ron Peters  1,154 – 5.89%
|
|Shane Kennedy  1,071 – 5.47
|
|Paul Geddes (Libertarian) 277 – 1.41%
||
|Douglas Horne
|-
| style="background:whitesmoke;"|Coquitlam-Maillardville
|
|Steve Kim  9,889 – 45.55%
||
|Selina Robinson  9,930 – 45.74%
|
|Edward Stanbrough  1,891 – 8.71%
|
|
|
|
||
|Diane Thorne†
|-
| style="background:whitesmoke;"|New Westminster
|
|Hector Bremner  8,944 – 33.44%
||
|Judy Darcy  13,026% – 48.70%
|
|Terry Teather  2,241 – 8.38%
|
|Paul Forseth  1,307 – 4.89%
|
|James Crosty (Ind.) 1,043 – 3.90%Lewis Dahlby (Libertarian) 189 – 0.71%
||
|Dawn Black†
|-
| style="background:whitesmoke;"|Port Coquitlam
|
|Barbara Lu 8,120 – 36.57%
||
|Mike Farnworth  11,755 – 52.94%
|
|
|
|Ryan Hague  1,525 – 6.87%
|
|Brent Williams (YPP) 447 – 2.01%Jogender Dahiya (Libertarian) 358 – 1.61%
||
|Mike Farnworth
|-
| style="background:whitesmoke;"|Port Moody-Coquitlam
||
|Linda Reimer  9,675 – 46.39%
|
|Joe Trasolini 9,238 – 44.29%
|
|Billie Helps 1,708% – 8.19%
|
|
|
|Jeff Monds (Libertarian) 237 – 1.14%
||
|Joe Trasolini
|-

Vancouver

|-
| style="background:whitesmoke;"|Vancouver-Fairview
|
|Margaret MacDiarmid  11,298 – 42.26%
||
|George Heyman  12,649 – 47.32%
|
|Matthew Pedley  2,785 – 10.42%
|
|
|
|
||
|Margaret MacDiarmid
|-
| style="background:whitesmoke;"|Vancouver-False Creek
||
|Sam Sullivan  11,328 – 52.43%
|
|Matt Toner  7,981 – 36.94%
|
|Daniel Tseghay  1,928 – 8.92%
|
|
|
|Ian James Tootill (Ind.) 199 – 0.92% Sal Vetro (BC First)  90 – 0.42%James Filippelli (YPP) 81 – 0.37%
||
|Mary McNeil†
|-
| style="background:whitesmoke;"|Vancouver-Fraserview
||
|Suzanne Anton  10,118 – 46.74%
|
|Gabriel Yiu  9,648 – 44.57%
|
|Stuart Mackinnon  1,230 – 5.68%
|
|Rajiv Pandey  653 – 3.02%
|
|
||
|Kash Heed†
|-
| style="background:whitesmoke;"|Vancouver-Hastings
|
|Fatima Siddiqui  5,946 – 27.66%
||
|Shane Simpson  12,782 – 59.46%
|
|Brennan Wauters  2,386 – 11.10%
|
|
|
|Carrol Woolsey (Socred)  384 – 1.79%
||
|Shane Simpson
|-
| style="background:whitesmoke;"|Vancouver-Kensington
|
|Gabby Kalaw  7,965 – 38.29%
||
|Mable Elmore  10,687 – 51.37%
|
|Chris Fjell  1,578 – 7.59%
|
|Raj Gupta  572 – 2.75%
|
|
||
|Mable Elmore
|-
| style="background:whitesmoke;"|Vancouver-Kingsway
|
|Gurjit Dhillon  6,600 – 35.98%
||
|Adrian Dix  10,419 – 56.79%
|
|Gregory Esau  1,327 – 7.23%
|
|
|
|
||
|Adrian Dix
|-
| style="background:whitesmoke;"|Vancouver-Langara
||
|Moira Stilwell  10,234 – 52.60%
|
|George Chow  7,447 – 38.28%
|
|Regan Zhang  1,055 – 5.42%
| 
|Gurjinder Bains  674 – 3.46%
|
|Espavo Sozo (Plat.)  45 – 0.23%
||
|Moira Stilwell
|-
| style="background:whitesmoke;"|Vancouver-Mount Pleasant
|
|Celyna Sherst  3,942 – 18.74%
||
|Jenny Kwan  13,845 – 65.83%
|
|Barinder Hans  2,506 – 11.92%
|
|
|
|William Austin (Marijuana) 349 – 1.66% Jeremy Gustafson (Ind.) 260 – 1.24% Peter Marcus (Comm.) 129 – 0.61%
||
|Jenny Kwan
|-
| style="background:whitesmoke;"|Vancouver-Point Grey
|
|Christy Clark  10,436 – 43.19%
||
|David Eby  11,499 – 47.35%
|
|Francoise Raunet  1,636 – 6.77%
|
|Duane Nickull  392 – 1.62%
|
|William Gibbens (Ind.)  72 0.30%Marisa Palmer (Libertarian)  66 – 0.27% Hollis Linschoten (Work Less) 66 – 0.27% Bernard Yankson (Plat.)  11 – 0.05%
||
|Christy Clark
|-
| style="background:whitesmoke;"|Vancouver-Quilchena
||
|Andrew Wilkinson  14,496 – 64.32%
|
|Nicholas Scapillati  5,705 – 25.31%
|
|Damian Kettlewell  1,667 – 7.40%
|
|Bill Clarke‡  671 – 2.98%
|
|
||
|Colin Hansen†
|-
| style="background:whitesmoke;"|Vancouver-West End
|
|Scott Harrison  5,349 – 28.25%
||
|Spencer Chandra Herbert  10,755 – 56.81%
|
|Jodie Emery  2,156 – 11.39%
|
|
|
|John Clarke (Libertarian) 446 – 2.36% Ronald Herbert (N.A.) 132 – 0.70% Mathew Kagis (Work Less) 94 – 0.50%
||
|Spencer Chandra Herbert
|-

North Shore and Sunshine Coast

|-
| style="background:whitesmoke;"|North Vancouver-Lonsdale
||
|Naomi Yamamoto  11,060 – 45.47%
|
|Craig Keating  9,872 – 40.58%
|
|Ryan Conroy  2,257 – 9.28%
|
|Allan Molyneaux  833 – 3.42%
|
|Laurence Watt (Libertarian)  156 – 0.64% Carra-Lynn Hodgson (BC Party) 77 – 0.32% Kimball Cariou (Comm.) 71 – 0.29%
||
|Naomi Yamamoto
|-
| style="background:whitesmoke;"|North Vancouver-Seymour
||
|Jane Thornthwaite  13,232 – 50.93%
|
|Jim Hanson  8,555 – 32.93%
|
|Daniel Smith  1,899 – 7.31%
|
|Brian Wilson  1,212 – 4.66%
|
|Jaime Webbe (Ind.)  1,085 – 4.18%
||
|Jane Thornthwaite
|-
| style="background:whitesmoke;"|Powell River-Sunshine Coast
|
|Patrick Muncaster  7,792 – 32.78%
||
|Nicholas Simons  13,120 – 55.20%
|
|Richard Till  2,856 – 12.02%
|
|
|
|
||
|Nicholas Simons
|-
| style="background:whitesmoke;"|West Vancouver-Capilano
||
|Ralph Sultan  15,777 – 67.03%
|
|Terry Platt  5,267 – 22.38%
|
|
|
|David Jones  1,156 – 4.91%
|
|Michael Markwick (Ind.)  1,018 – 4.32% Tunya Audain (Libertarian) 320 – 1.36%
||
|Ralph Sultan
|-
| style="background:whitesmoke;"|West Vancouver-Sea to Sky
||
|Jordan Sturdy  11,252 – 52.47%
|
|Ana Santos  6,963 – 32.47%
|
|Richard Warrington  2,349 – 10.95%
|
|Ian McLeod  657 – 3.06%
|
|Jon Johnson (Ind.)  224 – 1.04%
||
|Joan McIntyre†
|-

Vancouver Island

|-
| style="background:whitesmoke;"|Alberni-Pacific Rim
|   
|Darren DeLuca  6,341 – 34.52%
||
|Scott Fraser  10,570 – 57.55%
|
|
|   
|Enid Mary Sangster-Kelly  1,456 – 7.93%
|
|
||   
|Scott Fraser
|-
| style="background:whitesmoke;"|Comox Valley
||
|Don McRae  14,248 – 44.27%
|
|Kassandra Dycke  12,480 – 38.77%
|   
|Chris Aikman  3,718 – 11.55%
|   
|Diane Hoffmann  1,740 – 5.41%
|
|
||   
|Don McRae
|-
| style="background:whitesmoke;"|Cowichan Valley
|   
|Steve Housser  9,299 – 34.90%
||
|Bill Routley  10,696 – 40.14%
|   
|Kerry Davis  5,102 – 19.15%
|   
|Damir Wallener  1,223 – 4.59%
|
|Heather Campbell (Ind.)  326 – 1.22%
||
|Bill Routley
|-
| style="background:whitesmoke;"|Nanaimo
|   
|Walter Anderson  8,568 – 36.62%
||
|Leonard Krog  10,820 – 46.25%
|   
|Ian Gartshore  2,532 – 10.82%
|   
|Bryce Crigger  1,221 – 5.22%
|
|Brunie Brunie (Ind.)  253 – 1.08%
||   
|Leonard Krog
|-
| style="background:whitesmoke;"|Nanaimo-North Cowichan
|
|Amanda Jacobson  7,685 – 30.77%
||
|Doug Routley  11,542 – 46.21%
|   
|Mayo McDonough  3,430 – 13.73%
|
|John Sherry  1,603 – 6.42%
|
|Murray McNab (Ind.)  647 – 2.59%  P. Anna Paddon (Ind.) 71 – 0.28% 
||   
|Doug Routley
|-
| style="background:whitesmoke;"|North Island
|   
|Nick Facey  9,883 – 42.16%
||
|Claire Trevena  11,885 – 50.70%
|   
|
|
|Bob Bray  1,675 – 7.14%
|
|
||   
|Claire Trevena
|-
| style="background:whitesmoke;"|Parksville-Qualicum
||
|Michelle Stilwell  14,518 – 50.13%
|   
|Barry Avis  10,732 – 37.06%
|   
|
|   
|David Coupland  3,710 – 12.81%
|
|
||   
|Ron Cantelon†
|-

Greater Victoria

|-
| style="background:whitesmoke;"|Esquimalt-Royal Roads
|   
|Chris Ricketts  6,511 – 28.63%
||
|Maurine Karagianis  10,963 – 48.20%
|   
|Susan Low  4,928 – 21.67%
|
|
|
|Joshua Steffler (Ind.)  343 – 1.51%
||   
|Maurine Karagianis
|-
| style="background:whitesmoke;"|Juan de Fuca
|   
|Kerrie Reay  7,044 – 30.71%
||
|John Horgan  12,224 – 53.39%
|   
|Carlos Serra  3,646 – 15.90%
|
|
|
|
||   
|John Horgan
|-
| style="background:whitesmoke;"|Oak Bay-Gordon Head
|
|Ida Chong  7,767 – 29.29%
|
|Jessica Van der Veen  7,536 – 28.42
||   
|Andrew Weaver  10,722 – 40.43%
|   
|Greg Kazakoff  492 – 1.86%
|
|
||   
|Ida Chong
|-
| style="background:whitesmoke;"|Saanich North and the Islands
|
|Stephen Roberts  10,352 – 32.76%
||
|Gary Holman  10,515 – 33.27%
|   
|Adam Olsen  10,136 – 32.07%
|
|
|
|Scott McEachern (Ind.)  599 – 1.90%
||   
|Murray Coell
|-
| style="background:whitesmoke;"|Saanich South
|   
|Rishi Sharma  9,256 – 35.29%
||
|Lana Popham  11,946 – 45.55%
|    
|Branko Mustafovic  4,011 – 15.29%
|
|Joshua Galbraith  873 – 3.33%
|
|Peter Kappel (Ind.)  142 – 0.54%
||   
|Lana Popham
|-
| style="background:whitesmoke;"|Victoria-Beacon Hill
|
|Karen Bill  4,378 – 16.96%
||
|Carole James  12,560 – 48.65%
|   
|Jane Sterk  8,747 – 33.88%
|   
|
|
|John Shaw (Communist)  130 – 0.50%
||   
|Carole James
|-
| style="background:whitesmoke;"|Victoria-Swan Lake
|   
|Christina Bates  5,055 – 22.30%
||
|Rob Fleming  12,350 – 54.49%
|   
|Spencer Malthouse  5,260 – 23.21%
|   
|
|
|
||   
|Rob Fleming
|-

References

External links
 Elections BC: 40th Provincial General Election
 Legislative Assembly Library Election Weblinks

2013 elections in Canada
2013 in British Columbia
2013
May 2013 events in Canada